Cathy Leigh Justice (née Comer; born January 28, 1953) is an American educator and the current first lady of West Virginia since 2017.

Early life 
Cathy Leigh Comer, daughter and only child of Thomas Leigh and Virginia Ruth Comer, was born in Beckley, West Virginia and grew up in Prosperity, West Virginia.

She graduated from Woodrow Wilson High School in 1970 where she met her future husband, Jim Justice.

Cathy graduated from Marshall University with a degree in Secondary Education.

Career 

Justice served as president of Comer Electric, Inc., a business started by her family, and she was a member of the board of directors for First National Bank in Ronceverte for five years. She also spent time substitute teaching in Raleigh County Schools, and she is involved in a local reading program for elementary school students.

Justice became the first lady of West Virginia when her husband, Governor Jim Justice, was sworn in on January 16, 2017.

Shortly after her tenure as First Lady began, She celebrated Women's History Month with a televised speech on March 8, 2017. In her speech, Justice recognized a number of West Virginia women who have made a difference in the state, like novelist Pearl S. Buck, actress Jennifer Garner, and basketball player Vicky Bullett.

Personal life
Justice and her husband Jim reside in Lewisburg, West Virginia. The family chose not to reside in the West Virginia Governor's Mansion. The couple have two children, Jay Justice and Dr. Jill Justice.

Legal
In July 2021, Carter Bank & Trust, a banking company, went after Jim and Cathy Justice for a $58 million loan default based on guarantees they signed. The company filed claims over the millions of dollars based on defaults of The Greenbrier Sporting Club and Oakhurst Club.

References

External links
 Cathy Justice at West Virginia Public Broadcasting
 Cathy Justice at Twitter

1953 births
Living people
First Ladies and Gentlemen of West Virginia
Women in West Virginia politics
People from Beckley, West Virginia
American educators
Woodrow Wilson High School (Beckley, West Virginia) alumni
Marshall University alumni
American corporate directors
Businesspeople from West Virginia
Schoolteachers from West Virginia
People from Lewisburg, West Virginia